Japanagromyza is a genus of leaf miner flies in the family Agromyzidae. There are more than 80 described species in Japanagromyza.

Species
These 81 species belong to the genus Japanagromyza:

 Japanagromyza aequalis Spencer, 1966
 Japanagromyza aldrichi Frick, 1952
 Japanagromyza ambigua Sasakawa, 1992
 Japanagromyza angulosa Sasakawa, 2005
 Japanagromyza arcuaria Sousa & Couri, 2017
 Japanagromyza argentata Gu, Fan & Sasakawa, 1991
 Japanagromyza arnaudi Sasakawa, 1963
 Japanagromyza bennetti Spencer, 1973
 Japanagromyza brooksi Spencer, 1969
 Japanagromyza browni
 Japanagromyza centrosemae Frost, 1936
 Japanagromyza centrosematifolii Etienne & Martinez, 2002
 Japanagromyza cercariae Sasakawa, 1963
 Japanagromyza cestra
 Japanagromyza chapadensis Sousa & Couri, 2017
 Japanagromyza clausa Sasakawa, 1992
 Japanagromyza crinicolis
 Japanagromyza cupreata Sasakawa, 1963
 Japanagromyza currani Frost, 1936
 Japanagromyza delecta Spencer, 1962
 Japanagromyza desmodivora Spencer, 1966
 Japanagromyza deswadivora Spencer
 Japanagromyza displicata Sasakawa, 1963
 Japanagromyza dolobrata
 Japanagromyza duchesneae (Sasakawa, 1954)
 Japanagromyza elaeagni Sasakawa, 1954
 Japanagromyza etiennei Martinez, 1994
 Japanagromyza eucalypti Spencer, 1962
 Japanagromyza fortis Spencer, 1977
 Japanagromyza frosti Frick, 1952
 Japanagromyza howensis Spencer, 1977
 Japanagromyza hymenoedemia
 Japanagromyza inaequalis (Malloch, 1914)
 Japanagromyza incisa Sasakawa, 1966
 Japanagromyza inferna Spencer, 1973
 Japanagromyza insularum Spencer, 1963
 Japanagromyza involuta Spencer, 1977
 Japanagromyza jamaicensis Spencer, 1963
 Japanagromyza kalshoveni De Meijere, 1934
 Japanagromyza kammuriensis (Sasakawa, 1954)
 Japanagromyza laosica Sasakawa, 2009
 Japanagromyza laureata
 Japanagromyza lonchocarpi Boucher, 2006
 Japanagromyza loranthi Spencer, 1966
 Japanagromyza macroptilivora Esposito & Prado, 1993
 Japanagromyza meridiana Spencer, 1961
 Japanagromyza multiplicata Sasakawa, 1963
 Japanagromyza nebulifera Sasakawa, 2005
 Japanagromyza nesiota
 Japanagromyza nigrihalterata Spencer, 1959
 Japanagromyza orbitalis Frost, 1936
 Japanagromyza paganensis Spencer, 1963
 Japanagromyza parvula Spencer, 1961
 Japanagromyza perpetua Spencer, 1973
 Japanagromyza perplexa Spencer, 1975
 Japanagromyza phaseoli Spencer, 1983
 Japanagromyza philippinensis Sasakawa, 1996
 Japanagromyza polygoni Spencer, 1971
 Japanagromyza propinqua Spencer, 1973
 Japanagromyza quercus (Sasakawa, 1954)
 Japanagromyza rutiliceps (Melander, 1913)
 Japanagromyza salicifolii Collin, 1911
 Japanagromyza sasakawai Monteiro, Carvalho-Filho & Esposito
 Japanagromyza scelesta Spencer, 1966
 Japanagromyza setigera (Malloch, 1914)
 Japanagromyza sikandraensis Garg, 1971
 Japanagromyza sordidata Spencer, 1962
 Japanagromyza stylata Sasakawa, 1963
 Japanagromyza teestae Singh & Ipe, 1973
 Japanagromyza tephrosiae Meijere, 1917
 Japanagromyza tingomariensis Sasakawa, 1992
 Japanagromyza tokunagai Sasakawa, 1953
 Japanagromyza trientis Spencer, 1962
 Japanagromyza trifida Spencer, 1962
 Japanagromyza triformis Spencer, 1962
 Japanagromyza tristella (Thomson, 1869)
 Japanagromyza vanchei Singh & Ipe, 1973
 Japanagromyza viridula (Coquillett, 1902) (oak shothole leafminer)
 Japanagromyza wirthi Spencer, 1973
 Japanagromyza yanoi (Sasakawa, 1955)
 Japanagromyza yoshimotoi Sasakawa, 1963

References

Further reading

 
 

Agromyzidae
Articles created by Qbugbot
Opomyzoidea genera